The Ballivián Cabinet constituted the 12th to 14th cabinets of the Bolivian Republic. It was formed on 18 October 1841, 21 days after José Ballivián was installed as the 9th president of Bolivia following a coup d'état, succeeding the Third Velasco Cabinet. It was dissolved on 23 December 1847 upon Ballivián's resignation and was succeeded by the Cabinet of Eusebio Guilarte.

Composition

History 
Upon his assumption to office, Ballivián charged all ministerial portfolios to Division General José María Pérez de Urdininea, as minister general pending the formation of a proper ministerial cabinet. A full council of ministers was appointed on 18 October 1841, 21 days late, composed of three ministers. The Ministry of Public Instruction remained vacant for over a year before being reestablished on 4 November 1842. At the same time, the office of foreign affairs was reassigned from the interior to the instruction portfolio.

Two future presidents and one former president, José María Pérez de Urdininea (1828), Eusebio Guilarte (1847–1848), and Tomás Frías (1872–1873; 1874–1876) were members of this cabinet.

Cabinets

Structural changes

References

Notes

Footnotes

Bibliography 

 

1841 establishments in Bolivia
1847 disestablishments in Bolivia
Cabinets of Bolivia
Cabinets established in 1841
Cabinets disestablished in 1847